Raymond Peter Allison (born March 4, 1959) is a Canadian former professional ice hockey forward who played seven seasons in the National Hockey League for the Hartford Whalers and Philadelphia Flyers. He featured in the 1985 Stanley Cup Finals with the Flyers.

Allison was born in Cranbrook, British Columbia.

Playing career
Following a phenomenal junior career, Allison became the first ever draft pick in the history of the Hartford Whalers/Carolina Hurricanes franchise. He was expected to be a franchise player but failed to impress during his rookie season. A year later, Allison was traded in a ten player deal to Philadelphia. There he would develop into a scoring forward but suffered a broken ankle during the 1982–83 season. He never regained a regular spot on the Flyers roster, and played his last few seasons in the AHL and Swiss leagues.

Career statistics

Regular season and playoffs

International

Awards
 WCHL Second All-Star Team – 1978
 WHL First All-Star Team – 1979

References

External links
 

1959 births
Living people
Binghamton Whalers players
Brandon Travellers players
Brandon Wheat Kings players
Canadian ice hockey centres
EHC Bülach players
EHC Olten players
Hartford Whalers draft picks
Hartford Whalers players
Hershey Bears players
Ice hockey people from British Columbia
Maine Mariners players
National Hockey League first-round draft picks
Philadelphia Flyers players
SC Rapperswil-Jona Lakers players
Sportspeople from Cranbrook, British Columbia
Springfield Indians players